Nazzano is a comune (municipality) in the Metropolitan City of Rome in the Italian region Lazio, located about  north of Rome.

Twin towns
 Iași, Romania, since 1999

References

Cities and towns in Lazio